Lake Mattamuskeet is the largest natural lake in North Carolina. Lake Mattamuskeet lies on the Albemarle-Pamlico Peninsula.

Lake Mattamuskeet is the location of Mattamuskeet National Wildlife Refuge.  This refuge as well as surrounding public and private lands in eastern North Carolina are a major wintering site for waterfowl including ducks like northern pintail and green-wing teal, geese like Canada geese and tundra swans.

Gallery

New Holland
New Holland is a community in Hyde County, North Carolina, located along the southern shore of Lake Mattamuskeet.  Between 1911 and 1934, three private investment companies partnered with the public Mattamuskeet Drainage District to build the world's largest capacity pumping plant and dredge  of large navigable canals to drain  Lake Mattamuskeet for residential, commercial, and agricultural development. The lake drainage project also gave badly needed drainage relief to about 550 farmers around the lake whose farms drained by gravity into the huge lakebed. The investors created a community within the reclaimed lakebed and named it "New Holland," after similar land reclamation projects in the Netherlands. The drainage project ended when the third private owner sold the lake property to the United States government in 1934 to allow the creation of a migratory bird refuge. Today, Lake Mattamuskeet and the old town site of New Holland are on Mattamuskeet National Wildlife Refuge. The community on the south central side of Lake Mattamuskeet is still called "New Holland Community."

References

External links
The Mattamuskeet Foundation, Inc. - History of Lake Mattamuskeet
The Mattamuskeet Foundation, Inc. - Wildlife of Lake Mattamuskeet
Mattamuskeet National Wildlife Refuge - North Carolina - FWS
Lake Mattamuskeet, New Holland and Hyde County on the Open Library

Mattamuskeet
Bodies of water of Hyde County, North Carolina